Unity was the code name for Thailand's covert supply of mercenary soldiers to the Kingdom of Laos during the Laotian Civil War. From 4 July 1964 until March 1973, battalions of Thai volunteers fought Communist insurgents on the Plain of Jars in Military Region 2. As the Hmong L'Armée Clandestine was sapped by ongoing casualties and a limited basis for replacements, Unity battalions replaced them.

By December 1970, Unity battalions also began defensive operations against People's Army of Vietnam units pushing westward from the Ho Chi Minh trail in the southern Lao panhandle. By the time the Communists defeated the Royalists in February 1973, about 18,000 Thai volunteers were serving in Laos.

Overview

The Kingdom of Thailand occupied a delicate position during the Second Indochina War. The Kingdom of Laos was a buffer between the People's Republic of China and the Democratic Republic of Vietnam and Thailand, and their possible domination of the Thais. Laos also served as a buffer from the fighting in the Vietnam War. However, the Thai–Lao border of the Mekong River was easily breached. As a result, there was a consensus among Thais that communist encroachment should be stopped short of Thai territory. As an open effort would attract Chinese attention, the Thai government elected covert participation in the ongoing Laotian Civil War. The Police Aerial Reinforcement Unit (PARU) of the Border Patrol Police (BPP) became the liaison agents for that.

Background

As early as September 1958, the Royal Thai Army (RTA) began training Lao troops at Camp Erawan, Thailand. In April 1961, the first training camp in Thailand for Lao recruits opened in northeast Thailand; this effort was code named "Project Ekarad". The RTA created Headquarters 333 (HQ 333) to control its covert operations involving Laos. The Central Intelligence Agency (CIA) formed a Joint Liaison Detachment to coordinate its activities with HQ 333. Thai pilots and aviation specialists were also supplied sub rosa to the Royal Lao Air Force.

Special Requirement units

On 4 July 1964, to prepare for the Laotian offensive Operation Triangle, a Royal Thai artillery battalion of 279 men was flown from Korat, Thailand to the Plain of Jars, Laos. Equipped with a 155mm and five 105mm howitzers, the Thai battalion was emplaced to support Kong Le's Forces Armées Neutralistes (FAN). The request for the Thai unit was referred to as Project 008; as the first battalion deployed, the unit was dubbed Special Requirement 1.

In early 1966, Thai Prime Minister Phanom called for volunteers to serve in South Vietnam. There was an enthusiastic response from the male populace, with over 5,000 recruits just from Bangkok. It seems that this mobilization—which resulted in U.S.-funded Thai troops landing in South Vietnam in 1967—concealed the diversion of some of the manpower into Laos.

Succeeding Special Requirement units served as reinforcement of FAN forces stationed at the forward all-weather air strip at Muang Soui. During Campaign Toan Thang, on 24 June 1969, when People's Army of Vietnam (PAVN) troops had scattered FAN, Special Requirement 8's 317 men manned its guns and held its ground. An evacuation of FAN dependents via helicopter sapped the Neutralist will to resist, and they abandoned Moung Soui. Encircled and outnumbered by their attackers, under tank and artillery fire, the senior Thai officer at the site had to be ordered to withdraw. On 26 June, the Thais were helilifted out in Operation Swan Lake. Special Requirement 8 was disbanded once it was back in Thailand.

The Hmong L'Armée Clandestine fought three successful campaigns during 1969: Raindance, Operation Off Balance, and Kou Kiet. By the close of the latter, the Secret Army had dwindled to 5,000 to 5,500 Hmong effectives; they were faced by 22,000 Communist troops. The Hmong manpower pool was nearly dry, as only teenagers and aging men were still available. By comparison, there was an essentially bottomless pool of 10,000 replacements per year available for the Vietnamese Communists.

During the Vietnamese Campaign 139, which threatened the existence of Vang Pao's L'Armee Clandestine, 300 Thai artillerymen of Special Requirement 9 arrived at Long Tieng. They arrived on 18 March 1970, when Vang Pao's reserves were reduced to aircraft mechanics and bandsmen. They were followed in April by the RTA's 13th Regimental Combat Team, committed to a year's service in Laos. To "disguise" their assignment to Vang Pao's forces, the three infantry battalions, the new artillery battalion, and Special Requirement 9 were redesignated with French names as Lao units. Overall, the Thai units were dubbed Task Force Vang Pao. They established two fire support bases to house their artillery. As the summer progressed, units that had been transferred in from other Military Regions rotated to their home bases, and the Thai infantry replaced them in their strongholds.

Beginnings

In the wake of Lon Nol's ascension to the leadership of the Khmer Republic, in early June 1970 the Royal Thai Government (RTG) raised 5,000 volunteer recruits to serve there, and began training them. On 9 September, it was publicly announced that Thailand had decided not to send troops to Cambodia after all. Undisclosed was the secret negotiation between the United States and Thailand concerning the cost and use of those troops. When Lieutenant General Richard G. Stilwell claimed the U.S. budget for training and equipping those troops could pay for retraining the entire RTA instead, he was overridden. Department of Defense (DOD) would fund the redirection of these volunteers to Laos under the code name Unity. The CIA would train and run the Unity program. The volunteers were used to staff nine infantry battalions and an artillery battalion. Each infantry battalion would be filled with 495 recruits on a one year tour of duty. Each battalion would be stiffened with a cadre of 22 trainers and 33 medical specialists from the Thai Army. The very size of the projected Unity force was a decided escalation in Thailand's commitment in the Laotian War. The Unity training was moved to a larger base near Kanchanaburi, Thailand, capable of housing four battalions at a time. There the Thais were trained by a staff of 44 U.S. Special Forces troops. Meanwhile, both the RTG and the U.S. were so enthusiastic about Unity, they contemplated an expansion of the program even beyond the tenfold increase in progress.

Organization

Training and deployment

The first two battalions of these Thai mercenary volunteers were trained by early December 1970. With a dozen Royal Thai Special Forces (RTSF) as leavening in the cadre, the new units were deemed ready for service. The RLG, which had not been party to establishing Unity, now set conditions on the Thai deployment into Laos. The Thais had to be used in active operations, and they had to be far from the international press corps in Vientiane. Also, the battalions had to be disguised by being renamed as Bataillon Commandos (BC) to conform with RLA custom. Numbered 601 and 602 respectively, the new battalions began the new custom of numbering Thai mercenary units in the 600 series while they were in Lao service.

In June 1972, in an effort to boost recruitment for the Unity program, Thai volunteers without prior military training were accepted for service in Laos. The Unity force ballooned from a strength of 14,028 in June to 21,413 in September.

Military Region 4

On 15 December 1970, BC 601 and BC 602 were helilifted to the abandoned village of Houei Sai, Laos to begin military operations in Military Region 4. Operating under the code name Virakom, they were so successful that CIA case officers, noting the contrast with the Khmer troops of Project Copper, thought the Thais might recapture the Boloven Plateau for them.

On 27 July 1971, Unity troops were committed to Operation Sayasila in a drive to recapture the vital air strip at Salavan. Later in 1971, they would participate in similar offensives in Operation Bedrock and Operation Thao La. By December, the PAVN was pressuring the Royalists in operations designed to push them away from the Ho Chi Minh Trail and backwards toward Thailand.

By June 1972, Royalist defenses in southern Laos' panhandle had been beaten back until some Communist troops had pushed to the Mekong River border between Laos and Thailand. Unity troops were being shifted between Military Regions 2 and 4 to fend off increasing PAVN might. The Royalist Black Lion offensives—Operations Black Lion, Black Lion III, and Black Lion V—were waged from 15 June 1972 through 22 February 1973 in a vain attempt to stave off defeat. The Thai mercenaries made up most of the Royalist fighting force.

Military Region 2

The Royalists faced many difficulties in Military Region 2. Fire Support Base Puncher, the Ban Na outpost of Long Tieng, was surrounded by PAVN infantry and sappers. On 14 February 1971, an accidental bombing killed 30 civilians. By 15 February, Vang Pao's L'Armee Clandestine was in desperate shape. The PAVN were within striking distance of the main guerrilla base at Long Tieng. The next two Unity Battalions, BCs 603 and 604, were pulled from the final stages of training and sent to reinforce the Hmong irregulars. To maintain unit integrity, the Thais had to fend off Vang Pao's attempt to parcel out platoons of Thai replacements into Hmong guerrilla units. The Thais were trained to fight cohesively as mobile offensive troops, and they intended to retain that capability.

On 3 March, the first Thai battalions arrived at Long Tieng. Unity troops held the line through March; PAVN could not overrun Long Tieng and win the war before the rainy season quashed operations.

Unity battalions continued to transfer into MR 2. The Thais recaptured the advanced fighter base at Muang Soui by late September 1971. The Thais had also set up a network of artillery fire support bases with mutually interlocking fields of fire across the expanse of the Plain of Jars to defend it against the Communists.

Also in late September, the Unity forces had increased to the point where they rated their medical evacuation support. Ten armed UH-1M helicopters were acquired and stationed at Udorn RTAFB; 26 Thai pilots were trained to fly them. As many as six of the helicopters would fly north daily to the Plain, responding to the call sign White Horse.

By the end of 1971, when the Vietnamese launched Campaign Z, the Thai troops in L'Armee Clandestine had largely replaced the original Hmong militia. Although the Communist combined arms assault initially overran six Thai strongpoints, the Thai defense of the vital base at Long Tieng narrowly saved the Royalists from losing the war. The Thais were also the backbone of the Operation Strength I and Operation Strength II Royalist counteroffensives of February and March 1972. By May 1972, the Hmong manpower pool was so diminished that a CIA paramilitary adviser noted that his newly recruited battalion of guerrillas contained over 100 youths under 17 years of age, with about a dozen being 12 or younger. Indeed, with six percent of the Lao population under arms, the Royalists were running low on potential soldiers, regardless of ethnic background. As a result, the Unity force supplied most of the manpower for Operation Phou Phiang II and Operation Phou Phiang III. The last of the Thai battalions would remain in the field through the 22 February 1972 ceasefire, withdrawing in March.

Results

In contrast to the 11,000 Thai troops who served in South Vietnam, as many as 22,000 Thais may have served in Laos by 1971. Thai casualty figures are reported as 350 killed, and over 1,000 wounded. When the ceasefire ended the war on 22 February 1973, Unity consisted of 27 infantry and three artillery battalions, along with six heavy weapon companies. The Thai units were organized into three task forces. Total strength then stood at 17,808 troopers. With fighting ended, desertion began. Within a month, Thai strength dropped to 14,900 as the volunteers filtered south looking for fresh employment. By midyear, Unity had dwindled to 10,000 soldiers. They were removed from Laos during the next year. Although there was some thought of redirecting some Unity troops into the Cambodian theater, eventually they were discharged.

Notes

References

 Ahern, Thomas L. Jr. (2006). Undercover Armies: CIA and Surrogate Warfare in Laos. Center for the Study of Intelligence. Classified control no. C05303949.
 Anthony, Victor B. and Richard R. Sexton (1993). The War in Northern Laos. Command for Air Force History. .
 Conboy, Kenneth and James Morrison (1995). Shadow War: The CIA's Secret War in Laos. Paladin Press. .
 Tapp, Nicholas (2010). The Impossibility of Self: An Essay on the Hmong Diaspora: Volume 6 of Comparative Anthropological Studies in Society, Cosmology and Politics. LIT Verlag Münster. .

Laotian Civil War
Military of Thailand